"Finna Get Loose" is a song by American rapper Sean "Puff Daddy" Combs featuring fellow American musician Pharrell Williams. Produced by the latter, it was released on June 28, 2015.

Music video 
The music video directed by Hype Williams, the clip opens in stark black and white. The video was released on August 31, 2015 at Vevo and YouTube.

Commercial performance
"Finna Get Loose" debut for the Billboard Hot R&B/Hip-Hop Songs entering the chart at number 44. Its chart debut was supported by first-week digital download sales of 26,000 copies, along with 446,000 domestic streams. The song entering at number 15 on Billboard Bubbling Under Hot 100 Singles.

Track listing 
Digital download
"Finna Get Loose"  — 3:59

Charts

Weekly charts

References

2015 singles
2015 songs
Sean Combs songs
Pharrell Williams songs
Bad Boy Records singles
Epic Records singles
Music videos directed by Hype Williams
Songs written by Sean Combs
Songs written by Pharrell Williams

American funk songs